Ifeanyi Nnajiofor is a Nigerian Paralympic powerlifter. He represented Nigeria at the 2012 Summer Paralympics held in London, United Kingdom and he won the silver medal in the men's 60 kg event. He also competed in the 2014 IPC Powerlifting World Championships held in Dubai. Ifeanayi Nnajiofor's coach for these events was Prince Feyisetan Are.

References

External links 
 

Living people
Year of birth missing (living people)
Place of birth missing (living people)
Powerlifters at the 2012 Summer Paralympics
Medalists at the 2012 Summer Paralympics
Paralympic silver medalists for Nigeria
Paralympic medalists in powerlifting
Paralympic powerlifters of Nigeria
Nigerian powerlifters
21st-century Nigerian people